Friedrich Boerner or Börner (17 June 1723 – 30 June 1761) was a German physician.

Boerner was born in Leipzig. His father, Christian Friedrich Boerner, wanted him to study theology and he started to study theology at the University of Wittenberg, but eventually he finish medicine. He was a professor of this university until he had to come back to Leipzig the raising of Seven Years' War (1756–63). He died in Leipzig in 1761.

Works 
 De arte gymnastica nova, Dissertation, Helmstedt 1748
 Nachrichten von den vornehmsten Lebensumständen und Schriften jetztlebender berühmter Ärzte und Naturforscher in und um Deutschland, 1748–1764 14 Stück in 3 Bänden
 Untersuchung der Frage: Ob dem Frauenzimmer erlaubt sey, die Arzncykunst auszuüben? Leipzig 1750
 Commentatio de Alexandro Benedicto, medicinae post literas renatas restauratore. Braunschweig 1751
 Comment, de vita, moribus, meritis et scriptis Hieronyini Mercurialis, Forolivicnsis. Braunschweig 1751
 Comment, de Cosma et Damiano, artis medicae olim et adhuc hodie hinc illincque tutelaribus. Cum tabb. aen. Helmstedt 1751
 Comment. de vita et meritis Martini Pollichii, Mellerstadii, primi in Academia Vitembergensi Rectoris Magnifici et Prof. med. Wolfenbüttel 1751
 Bibliothecae libiorum rariorum physico – medicorum historico – criticae. Specimen I. Helmstedt 1751 – Specimen II. Helmstedt 1752
 Super locum Hippocratis, in iureiurando maxime vexatum, meditationes. Leipzig 1752
 Noctes Guelphicae, sive opuscu’a argumenti med. Litterarii, 1755
 Relationes de libris physico- medicis etc. Fasc. I, 1756
 Memoriae professorum medicinae in Academia Vittebergensi, inde a primis illius initiis renovatae Spec. I. II., 1755, 1756

References 
 www.zedler-lexikon.de

External links
 
 wikisource

1723 births
1761 deaths
18th-century German writers
18th-century German physicians
18th-century German male writers